This is a list of government and municipal institutions of Latvia and their subordinated institutions with executive powers:

Main institutions 
Latvian Chancery of the President

Saeima

Constitutional Court of the Republic of Latvia

Supreme Court of the Republic of Latvia

The State Audit Office

Latvijas Banka

The Central Election Commission

The Financial and Capital Market Commission

The Ombudsman's Office

The National Council for Electronic Media

The Public Utilities Commission

Prime Minister's subordinate bodies 
Corruption Prevention and Combating Bureau

Society Integration Foundation

Coordination Centre of Policy Sectors

Ministries of the Republic of Latvia

Ministry of Defence
National Armed Forces

National Defence Academy

Recruiting and Youth Guard Centre

Military Intelligence and Security Service

Latvian Geospatial Information Agency

National Defence Military Objects and Procurement Centre

State Agency "Latvian War Museum"

Military magazine "Tēvijas Sargs"

Ministry of Foreign Affairs
The Latvian Institute

Ministry of Economics
Latvian Investment and Development Agency

Tourism Development Agency

Consumer Rights Protection Centre

The Central Statistical Bureau

Standardization, Accreditation and Metrology Centre

Competition Council

Ministry of Finance
Treasury of the Republic of Latvia

Procurement Monitoring Bureau

Central Finance and Contracting Agency

Lotteries and Gambling Supervisory Inspection

State Revenue Service

Ministry of the Interior
Latvian State Police

The Security Police

The Office of Citizenship and Migration Affairs

Ministry of the Interior Information Centre

State Fire and Rescue Service

Provision State Agency

Interior Ministry of Health and Sports Center

Clinic of the Ministry of the Interior 

State Border Guard

Ministry of Science and Education
Higher Education Quality Evaluation Center

State Education Centre

State Education Quality Service

State Education Development Agency

Latvian Academic Information Centre

Studies and Science Administration

State Agency "Latvian Language Agency"

Latvian Council of Science

Latvian Academy of Sciences

Social Correction Educational Institution "Naukšēni"

Youth International Programme Agency

State Agency "Latvian Sports Museum"

Murjāņi Sports Gymnasium

Ministry of Culture
Latvian National Archives

State Inspection for Heritage Protection

The National Film Centre

Cultural and Intangible Heritage Center

Ministry of Welfare
State Labour Inspection

State Children Rights Protection Inspectorate

State Social Insurance Agency

Social Integration State Agency

Health and Work Expert Physicians' Commission

National Employment Agency

Ministry of Transport
Latvian Civil Aviation Agency

Transport Accident and Incident Investigation Bureau

The State Railway Technical Inspectorate

State Railway Administration

Ministry of Justice
Constitution Protection Bureau

State Land Service

The Register of Enterprises of the Republic of Latvia

Data State Inspectorate

The Court Administration

State Probation Service

State Forensic Science Bureau

State Agency "Insolvency Administration"

Maintenance Guarantee Fund Administration

Prison Administration

Patent Office

State Language Centre

The Legal Aid Administration

Ministry of Environmental Protection and Regional Development
The State Environmental Service

Nature Protection Board

State Agency "Latvian Museum of Natural History"

State Regional Development Agency

State Environmental Bureau

State Agency "National Botanic Garden of Latvia"

Latvian Institute of Aquatic Ecology

Latvian Environmental Protection Fund Administration

Ministry of Health
The National Health Service

Disease Prevention and Control Center

Health Inspectorate of Latvia

State Emergency Medical Service

State Agency of Medicines

State Blood Donor Center

State Forensic Science Bureau

National Sports Medicine Centre

Pauls Stradiņš Museum of Medical History

Riga Stradiņš University

Ministry of Agriculture
Rural Support Service

State Forest Service

State Plant Protection Service

State Agency "Agricultural Data Centre"

Latvian State Institute of Agrarian Economics

Latvia University of Life Sciences and Technologies

State Technical Supervision Agency

Latvian State Institute of Fruit-Growing

State Stende Cereals Breeding Institute

State Priekuļi Plant Breeding Institute

Latvian State Forest Research Institute "Silava"

National Research Institute of "Food Safety, Animal Health and Environment Research Institute"

Food and Veterinary Service

References

External links 
 Ministry of Defence
 Ministry of Foreign Affairs
 Ministry of Economics
 Ministry of Finance
 Ministry of the Interior
 Ministry of Science and Education
 Ministry of culture
 The Ministry of Welfare
 Ministry of transport 
 Ministry of Justice
 Ministry of Environmental Protection and Regional Development 
 Ministry of Health
 The Ministry of Agriculture
 Politics in Latvia

Institutions